The 2007 Spanish motorcycle Grand Prix was the second round of the 2007 MotoGP championship. It took place on the weekend of 23–25 March 2007 at the Circuito Permanente de Jerez.

MotoGP classification

250 cc classification

125 cc classification

Championship standings after the race (MotoGP)

Below are the standings for the top five riders and constructors after round two has concluded.

Riders' Championship standings

Constructors' Championship standings

 Note: Only the top five positions are included for both sets of standings.

References

Spanish motorcycle Grand Prix
Spanish
motorcycle